is an amateur archaeologist in Japan. He reenacted the Jōmon period (the Stone Age in Japan) for 20 years. He is well known in Japan since the mass media introduced his Jōmon life. He is now compiling a memoir of his Jōmon life. He established a private museum of the Jōmon period at Tsu, Mie Prefecture.

References

External links 
 Interview article at gendai.net (including his photo) (in Japanese)
 An article including interview (in German)

Japanese archaeologists
Historical reenactment
Living people
1931 births